is a railway station in the city of Suzaka, Nagano, Japan, operated by the private railway operating company Nagano Electric Railway.

Lines
Hino Station is a station on the Nagano Electric Railway Nagano Line and is 11.0 kilometers from the terminus of the line at Nagano Station.

Station layout
The station consists of one ground-level side platform serving one bi-directional track. The station is unattended.

Adjacent stations

History
The station opened on 28 June 1926. The station was closed on 11 January 1944, and re-opened on 8 October 1987.

Passenger statistics
In fiscal 2016, the station was used by an average of 209 passengers daily (boarding passengers only).

Surrounding area

Hino Elementary School

See also
 List of railway stations in Japan

References

External links

 

Railway stations in Japan opened in 1926
Railway stations in Nagano Prefecture
Nagano Electric Railway
Suzaka, Nagano